Robert Webster may refer to:

 Robert Webster (virologist) (born 1932), New Zealand avian influenza expert
 Sir Robert Webster (politician) (born 1951), Australian company director, grazier, parliamentarian and chancellor of University of New South Wales
 Robert K. Webster (born 1938), American phytopathologist
 Robert M. Webster (1892–1972), United States Air Force major general
 Robert N. Webster, a pseudonym of Raymond A. Palmer
 Robert Webster, footballer, co-founder of Norwich City F.C.
 Robert Edward Webster (1928–1999), US plastics technician who defected to the Soviet Union in 1959, returning in 1962
 Robert Grant Webster, British Member of the UK Parliament for St Pancras East
 Bob Webster (born 1938), American Olympic diving champion